Robert Maxwell Joffe (January 31, 1908 – February 3, 1971) was an American radio and television producer, screenwriter, and entertainment executive. He was one of the producers (and a writer and director) of The Adventures of Superman radio show and a producer of several TV series, including the early episodes of both Adventures of Superman (1951–1954)  and Lassie (1954–1957; executive producer 1957-1958). Maxwell acquired the rights to Lassie in 1953 for $2,000 and sold the popular television program starring the collie to Jack Wrather in 1956 for a reported $3.5 million.

He also was the producer of Creeps by Night (1944) on the Blue Network.

He also wrote episodes of the Superman radio and TV series as Richard Fielding (a pseudonym that he shared with fellow producers Whitney Ellsworth and Maxwell's then wife, Jessica Fielding Maxwell).

Many early episodes of Lassie, as well as episodes of National Velvet, were written by Robert Maxwell under the pseudonym Claire Kennedy.

At the time of his death in Toronto, Canada, he was married to Barbara Maxwell and had two sons.

References

External links
 

1908 births
1971 deaths
American radio producers
American male screenwriters
Television producers from New York City
People from Brooklyn
20th-century American businesspeople
Screenwriters from New York (state)
20th-century American male writers
20th-century American screenwriters